Zheleznodorozhnoy stantsii Vysokaya Gora (Biyektaw timer yul stantsiyase bistäse) is a rural locality (a settlement) and the administrative center of Vysokogorsky District of the Republic of Tatarstan, Russia. Population:

References

Notes

Sources

Rural localities in Vysokogorsky District
Kazansky Uyezd